Kimmie, Kimmy, Kimmey or Kimmi is a given name, usually feminine and often a short form (hypocorism) of Kimberly or Kimberley. It may refer to:

Women
 Kimmey Raschke (born 1974), Puerto Rican politician
 Kimmi Kappenberg, a contestant on the reality TV shows Survivor: The Australian Outback and Survivor: Cambodia
 Kimmi Lewis (1957–2019), American politician
 Kimberly "Kimmie" Meissner (born 1989), American retired figure skater
 Kimmie Rhodes (born 1954), American singer-songwriter
 Kimmy Robertson (born 1954), American actress
 Kimberley "Kimmie" Taylor (born 1989), English woman who joined a Kurdish militia in Syria
 Kimmy Tong (born 1990), Chinese actress

Men
 Kimmie Weeks (born 1981), Liberian human rights activist

Fictional characters
 Kimmy Gibbler in the American television series Full House
 Kimmy GoDongHae, in the Filipino film series Kimmy Dora
 Kimberly "Kimmy" Schmidt, the title character of the Netflix series Unbreakable Kimmy Schmidt
 Kimmy, a playable character in the mobile game Mobile Legends: Bang Bang

Hypocorisms